Borsi (Greek: Μπόρσι) is a hillside community in Elis, Greece. It is part of the municipal unit of Lechaina. It is situated near the Pineios reservoir, about 17 km east of Lechaina proper. Between 1841 and 1912, the community was part of the old municipality of Vouprasia. The nearest villages are Aetorrachi to the east and Kentro to the south.

Population

See also
List of settlements in Elis

References

Lechaina
Populated places in Elis